Alexander Gustav Georg Olbricht (6 June 1876, Breslau - 11 November 1942, Weimar) was a German artist. He created approximately 2,000 graphics, engravings, silhouettes and oil paintings.

Biography 

His father, Gustav Olbricht (1851–1892) was a painter and art restorer at the Silesian Museum of Fine Arts. At the age of sixteen, he was employed by the firm of "P. Strunk", an art material supplier.

In 1899, he transferred to the Grand-Ducal Saxon Art School, Weimar, and studied with Theodor Hagen. Five years later, he married Margarethe Thurow (1882–1972), from Mecklenburg, whom he had met at the school. After this, he gradually gave up oil painting in favor of graphics and printmaking.

In 1908, he produced his first large format etchings and, the following year, produced a series of twenty small format etchings depicting Weimar and its surroundings. He was drafted at the beginning of World War I but, due to his relatively frail condition, served only briefly as a batman to an officer in Weimar.

In 1921, he was named a Professor at Bauhaus University. He served until 1935, when he was dismissed for political reasons, despite having become tenured. In 1936, the Nazi government dissolved and banned the Deutscher Künstlerbund, of which he had been a member for many years. Together, this resulted in a period of stagnation and depression. Nevertheless, in 1939, he was able to complete his last major cycle of etchings, "The First Snow".

He died of a stroke in 1942. Following the war, a street in Weimar was named after him, his studio was reconstructed at the Stadtmuseum and a plaque was placed on his home. The Duchess Anna Amalia Library acquired 88 books from his estate. Some of his works may be seen at the Museum of Modern Art in New York and the Los Angeles County Museum of Art.

References

Further reading 
 Walter Hertzsch: Alexander Olbricht - Zeichnungen, Insel-Verlag (1989)  
 Alexander Olbricht: Vierundzwanzig Zweige, Der erste Schnee : zwei Folgen farbiger Zeichnungen (The First Snow), Insel-Verlag (1987)  
 Cornelius Müller Hofstede: Hinter Drahtzaun und Bahnschranke: zur Ausstellung von Professor Alexander Olbricht im Schlesischen Museum der bildenden Künste in Breslau, 1941.

External links 

 
 Galerie Profil

1876 births
1942 deaths
Artists from Wrocław
German engravers
German etchers